The ahuru (Auchenoceros punctatus) is a species of morid cod found in waters off the eastern coast of New Zealand and to the south as well as in the Cook Strait. It is the only known species of its genus.

References

 
 
Tony Ayling & Geoffrey Cox, Collins Guide to the Sea Fishes of New Zealand,  (William Collins Publishers Ltd, Auckland, New Zealand 1982) 

Moridae

Endemic marine fish of New Zealand
Fish described in 1873